Theodore Rose Cogswell (March 10, 1918 – February 3, 1987) was an American science fiction author.

Profile
During the Spanish Civil War, Cogswell served as an ambulance driver for the Republicans as part of the Abraham Lincoln Brigade.

His earliest work to be published in a genre magazine, the novella, "The Spectre General" in Astounding (June 1952)., was a humorous story concerning the long-forgotten maintenance brigade of the Imperial Space Marines of a Galactic empire. It was selected as one of the genre's best novellas by members of the Science Fiction Writers of America and reprinted in The Science Fiction Hall of Fame. 

Cogswell authored nearly 40 science fiction stories, most of them humorous, and co-authored Spock, Messiah!, one of the earliest novels tied in to the Star Trek franchise. He was also the editor of the long-running "fanzine for pros", Proceedings of the Institute for Twenty-First Century Studies. A anthology of elections from PITCS was published by NESFA Press in 1993. Here, writers and editors discussed their own, and other's, works.

Bibliography

Novels
Spock, Messiah! (1976) (Star Trek tie-in novel co-authored Charles A. Spano, Jr.)

Collections
The Wall Around the World (1962) (including the title story)
The Third Eye (1968)

Other works
"The Friggin Falcon" (1966) (poem)
PITCS: Proceedings of the Institute for Twenty-First Century Studies (1993, editor)

External links

1918 births
1987 deaths
American science fiction writers
Abraham Lincoln Brigade members
20th-century American novelists
American male novelists
American male short story writers
20th-century American short story writers
20th-century American male writers